Sheffield City Council elections took place on Thursday 3 May 2007 with one third of council seats up for election; one in each ward. Since the previous election, Liberal Democrat Martin Davis (representing Stocksbridge & Upper Don) defected, sitting as an independent. This set of elections saw the Conservatives lose the only seat they had on the council since 1996, and the party did not have any councillors elected to Sheffield City Council until 2021.

The election seen several gains for the Liberal Democrats, returning the council to no overall control. Overall turnout was 36.0%, up slightly from last year's 34.5%.

Councillors before and after the election

Election result

This result had the following consequences for the total number of seats on the council after the elections:

Ward results

Arbourthorne

Beauchief & Greenhill

Beighton

Birley

Broomhill

Burngreave

Central

Crookes

Darnall

Dore & Totley

East Ecclesfield

Ecclesall

Firth Park

Fulwood

Gleadless Valley

Graves Park

Hillsborough

Manor Castle

Mosborough

Nether Edge

Richmond

Shiregreen & Brightside

Southey

Stannington

Stocksbridge & Upper Don

Walkley

West Ecclesfield

Woodhouse

References

2007 English local elections
2007
2000s in Sheffield